"I Didn't Raise My Boy to Be a Soldier" is an American anti-war song that was influential within the pacifist movement that existed in the United States before it entered World War I. It is one of the first anti-war songs. Lyricist Alfred Bryan collaborated with composer Al Piantadosi in writing the song, which inspired a sequel, some imitations, but also a number of scornful parodies. It was recorded by The Peerless Quartet in December 1914 and was a hit in 1915, selling 650,000 copies. Its expression of popular pacifist sentiment "helped make the pacifist movement a hard, quantifiable political reality to be reckoned with."

Themes

The song gives the lament of a lonely mother whose son has been lost in the war:

She comments on the irony of war being between different mothers' sons, killing each other with muskets. Conflict between nations should be resolved by arbitration, not by the sword and the gun. Victory is not enough to console a mother for the loss of her son, and the blighting of her home. War would end if all mothers said they would not raise their sons as soldiers. The song thus apparently connects the suffragist and pacificist movements.

The somber nature of the lyrics also reflected the neutrality mentality that was common in the United States in early 1915.

Impact and response

"I Didn't Raise My Boy to Be a Soldier" helped solidify the anti-war movement enough to make it politically relevant on the national stage. The song was in the top 20 charts from January to July 1915 and reached number 1 in March and April. The song's success and its resulting political strength brought supporters to the pacifist movement whose main priority was other issues. Unreconstructed Southerners appealed to popular distaste for the war in Europe in order to argue that the Civil War had been no more justified, and suffragists joined the peace movement because of its political potential and leverage in the campaign for women's right to vote.  As with the later 1930s hit "God's Country", it shows that American popular music "generally reflects the isolationist tendencies of the public" and that pro-war songwriters were rarely successful.

"I Didn't Raise My Boy to Be a Soldier" was praised especially by anti-Britain groups in the United States – Irish, German, and Church ministers of many denominations. The song became known in a number of countries which were already at war – in Britain and in Australia notably.

Other versions
In 1968 the Eli Radish Band recorded an updated Outlaw Country Rock version of the song to protest the Vietnam War.  Their Capitol Records album bore the same title. Hamish Imlach released a version of the song on his 1987 album Sonny's Dream.  The lyrics were altered for context, including reference to the British Empire.

Political reaction
Back in its day, prominent politicians attacked the song both for its pacifism and early feminism. Theodore Roosevelt remarked that "foolish people who applaud a song entitled 'I Didn't Raise My Boy To Be A Soldier' are just the people who would also in their hearts applaud a song entitled 'I Didn't Raise my Girl To Be A Mother'".

Harry Truman, then a captain in the National Guard, hated the song. He suggested that the place for women who opposed the war was in a harem, not in the United States.

Many parodies of the song were produced, such as "I Did Not Raise My Boy to Be a Coward," and "I Didn't Raise My Boy to Be a Soldier, But I'll Send My Girl to Be a Nurse." Parody poems and other responses were also produced such as "They Didn't Raise Their Son to Be a Soldier", "I Didn't Raise My Dog to Be a Sausage", and "I Didn't Raise My Ford to Be a Jitney." According to Groucho Marx, a popular joke of the period concerned a poker game in which a cardplaying mother states, "I didn't raise my boy, he had the joker".

Original lyrics
Lyrics per original sheet music

See also
 List of anti-war songs

Footnotes

Further reading
 Bryan, Alfred, Al Piantadosi, and Will J. Ward. I Didn't Raise My Boy to Be a Soldier. New York: Leo Feist, 1915.  
 Monod, David. "I Didn't Raise My Boy to Be a Soldier: : Popular Song and American Neutrality, 1914–1917" War in History (2017) 24#4: 438-457.  Abstract
 Recorded Anthology of American Music, Inc. Praise the Lord and Pass the Ammunition: Songs of World Wars I & II. Recorded Anthology of American Music, 1977. 
 The Big Book of Nostalgia: Piano, Vocals, Guitar. Milwaukee, WI: Hal Leonard Corp, 1995.   
Paas, John Roger. 2014. America sings of war: American sheet music from World War I''. .

External links
 View the song MP3 and sheet music here.

Songs about soldiers
Songs about the military
Anti-war songs
American songs
1915 songs
Songs with lyrics by Alfred Bryan
Songs of World War I
Opposition to World War I
Songs written by Al Piantadosi